This is a list of women photographers who were born in New Zealand or whose works are closely associated with that country:

B 
Janet Bayly (born 1955), photographer, curator and gallery director
Rhondda Bosworth (born 1944), photographer and artist
Alice Brusewitz, commercial photographer
Jessie Buckland (1878–1939), photographer and studio owner

C
Norah Carter (1881–1966), studios in Christchurch and Gisborne
Gillian Chaplin (born 1948), photographic artist and curator
Fiona Clark (born 1954), photographer
Suzanna Clarke (born 1961), photographer, photojournalist, writer
Emily Florence Cazneau (c. 1861–1892), Wellington photographer
Harriet Sophia Cobb (1855–1929), Hawkes Bay photographer and studio owner
Norah Carter (1881–1966), New Zealand photographer, photographic studio owner and painter

D
Judy Darragh (born 1957), sculptor, assemblage artist, photographer, painter 
 Eileen Olive Deste (1908–1986), British-born New Zealand photographer

F
Nellie Ferner (1869–1930), artist, photographer, community leader
Rosaline Margaret Frank (1864–1954), early female photographer
Marti Friedlander (1928–2016), Jewish immigrant, social activist, photographed children and Maori women

G
Eunice Harriett Garlick (1883–1951), landscapes and Maori studies
Elizabeth Greenwood (1873–1961), Wellington photographer

H
Gil Hanley (born 1934), photographer
Amy Merania Harper (1900–1998), studio in Auckland, portraitist
Claire Harris, photographer, artist
Alexis Hunter (1948–2014), contemporary painter, photographer, based in London
Alyson Hunter (born 1948), photographer and print maker based in London

K
 Thelma Rene Kent (1899–1946), early female photographer
 Marion Kirker (1879–1971), New Zealand photographer

M
Ruth McDowall (born 1984), photographer, photojournalist, educator, working in central Nigeria
May and Mina Moore (1881–1931, 1882–1957), photographer
Margaret Moth (1951–2010), photojournalist with CNN

N
 Robina Nicol (1861–1942), photographer
 Anne Noble (born 1954), series related to religion and family members

P
Fiona Pardington (born 1961), artistic photographer, educator
 Elizabeth Pulman (1836–1900), New Zealand's first female photographer, studio in Auckland

S
 Marie Shannon (born 1960), photographer and educator
Ann Shelton (born 1967), photojournalist, fine arts photographer, educator

T
Roberta Thornley (born 1985), portraits from Rwanda
Yvonne Todd (born 1973), contemporary photographer
Mabel Tustin (1884–1967), photographer and studio owner

U
Jane Ussher (born 1953), portraitist, images of Antarctica

W
Christine Webster (born 1958), visual artist and photographer
Ans Westra (1936–2023), Dutch-born New Zealand studio and documentary photographer, Māori images
Margaret Matilda White (1868–1910), Irish-born New Zealand photographer

Y
Adele Younghusband (1878–1969), painter, photographer

See also
List of women photographers

References

Lists of women photographers
Photographers
photographers
Lists of photographers by nationality